Turkish Armed Forces Medal of Honor is the highest medal that can be bestowed upon an individual by the Turkish Armed Forces (TAF) and was first created on July 27, 1967.

Technical specifications

General 
Five large and five small gold stars on dark blue background circling an insignia of a crescent moon and a star on red background, the symbol of the Turkish flag, pointing upwards.

Decoration (regular size) 
Made of eight pieces
 Metal:    Bronze
 Minting:  0.2 micrometre polished gold-plating
 Weight:   54 grams
 Diameter: 6 cm

Decoration (miniature size) 
Made of three pieces
 Metal:    Bronze
 Minting:  0.2 micrometre polished gold-plating
 Weight:   14 grams
 Diameter: 1 cm

Ribbon 
 Color: Red

Criteria 
During wartime, it is bestowed on individuals who, through their actions, have contributed to success in battle but whose valor would not be adequately compensated by the State War Medal.

During peacetime, it is bestowed upon the Commanders of the Turkish Army, the Turkish Navy, the Turkish Air Force and the Turkish Gendarmerie who have successfully completed at least a year in their posts.

The medal can be given to civilians or soldiers, regardless of nationality.  Its bestowment is proposed and approved by any of the four Commanders mentioned above.

Recipients 
 Hüseyin Kıvrıkoğlu

See also 
 Medal of Independence (Turkey)
 Turkish Armed Forces Medal of Distinguished Service
 Turkish Armed Forces Medal of Distinguished Courage and Self-Sacrifice

References 
 TAF website with a list of its medals
 Turkish Army website with a list of its medals

External links
 TAF website in English

Military awards and decorations of Turkey
1967 establishments in Turkey
Awards established in 1967